Gordon Valley is a small valley, the western half of which is occupied by a lobe of ice from Walcott Neve, lying west of Mount Falla in the Queen Alexandra Range, Antarctica. It was named by the Advisory Committee on Antarctic Names after Mark A. Gordon, a United States Antarctic Research Program aurora scientist at Hallett Station, 1959.

References

Valleys of the Ross Dependency
Shackleton Coast